The  ("Society for the Furtherance of Charitable Activities") is Lübeck's oldest charitable organization.

History 

The democratically structured and middle class society and its social house (from 1826 at the address Breite Strasse 33, and from 1891 at Königstrasse 5) rapidly became the centre of practical reform work in the spirit of the Enlightenment. The company was involved in the improvement of conditions in many areas of life; for example, it established a River Lifesavers Institute. It was associated with the newspaper Neue Lübeckische Blätter and with the Jung-Lübeck, a Vormärz movement.

In 1938 their concert, theatre and lecture hall, the Kolosseum, was moved to the Kronsforder Allee.

On its hundredth anniversary in 1889 it received Lübeck's highest honour, the Gedenkmünze Bene Merenti. It is the only incorporated society to win this award. Eight former directors were given medals.

Present 
The society has numerous subsidiary societies and unions, which contribute to the cultural and social life of the city. For example, it found a home for the St. Mary's Boys' Choir on the premises of the society in the Bürgergärten. As a trustee it manages a large number of dependent organisations, such as the Ferdinand Heinrich Grautoff-Stiftung.

Directors of the society 

Note. The term of office is three years; immediately following terms are not specifically highlighted in the table, but can be deduced. Additional terms of office, after the term of a different incumbent, are marked by asterisks, so ** indicates a second additional period, and *** indicates a third. The Ratslinie number gives the position in the official register of 1925, Emil Ferdinand Fehling's Ratslinie.

See also 
 Lübeckische Blätter, newspaper
 Der Wagen, an almanac for Lübeck
 Patriotische Gesellschaft von 1765 ("Patriotic Society of 1765") in Hamburg
 Gesellschaft für das Gute und Gemeinnützige Basel, a charity in Basel

Bibliography 
 Friedrich Bruns: Die Lübecker Syndiker und Ratssekretäre bis zur Verfassungsänderung von 1851 in: ZVLGA Band 29 (1938), S. 91 – 168.
 Hermann Stodte: Festschrift zur 150-Jahr-Feier der Gesellschaft zur Beförderung gemeinnütziger Tätigkeit zu Lübeck, begründet 1789. Lübeck 1939.
 Georg Behrens, 175 Jahre Gemeinnütziges Wirken, Lübeck 1964
 Ahasver von Brandt: Das Lübecker Bürgertum zur Zeit der Gründung der "Gemeinnützigen" – Menschen, Ideen und soziale Verhältnisse. In: Der Wagen 1966, S. 18–33.
 Emil Ferdinand Fehling, Lübeckische Ratslinie, Lübeck 1925.
 Vorsteherschaft der Gesellschaft (Hrsg.), 200 Jahre Gesellschaft zur Beförderung gemeinnütziger Tätigkeit in Lübeck 1789–1989, Lübeck 1989

Notes

External links 

 Gemeinnützige

Charities based in Germany
Culture in Lübeck
1789 establishments in the Holy Roman Empire
Organizations established in 1789
Non-profit organisations based in Schleswig-Holstein